Maud Herbert (born 13 March 1974) is a French windsurfer. She was 4th in the sailboard (Lechner) class at the 1992 Summer Olympics.

She is one of the Women multiple medallist at the Windsurfing World Championships.

References

External links
 
 
 

1974 births
Living people
French windsurfers
Female windsurfers
French female sailors (sport)
Olympic sailors of France
Sailors at the 1992 Summer Olympics – Lechner A-390
Sailors at the 1996 Summer Olympics – Mistral One Design
20th-century French women